Robat-e Khakestari (also Romanized as Robāţ-e Khākestarī) is a village in Sarjam Rural District, Ahmadabad District, Mashhad County, Razavi Khorasan Province, Iran. At the 2006 census, its population was 119, in 31 families.

References 

Populated places in Mashhad County